Rákoskeresztúr is a former town in Hungary now part of District XVII of Budapest. Rákoskeresztúr was united with Budapest on January 1, 1950.

Background

The first written mark (the name Pousarakusa, in modern Hungarian Pósarákosa) was a title-deed written in 1265. The name was given by the region's first occupant. In that title-deed the region was given to the Crusaders of Upper-Heviz. The village was almost destroyed in the Turkish assault. In 1662, only eight peasant- and 2 cotter families lived in it. From 1727 to 1950, it was counted as a town. In 1880, Rákoshegy and Rákosliget are cut off from Rákoskeresztúr. In 1950, Rákoskeresztúr, Rákoshegy, Rákosliget and the newly built Rákoskert were joined together as the XVII. district of Budapest.

Rákosmente
Neighbourhoods of Budapest
Former municipalities of Hungary
1265 establishments in Europe